Acton Township may refer to the following townships in the United States:

 Acton Township, Meeker County, Minnesota
 Acton Township, Walsh County, North Dakota